Murdoch is an Irish/Scottish given name, as well as a surname. The name is derived from old Irish Gaelic words mur, meaning "sea" and murchadh, meaning "sea warrior". The following is a list of notable people or entities with the name.

Given name 

 Muireadhach I, Earl of Menteith, Scottish nobleman
 Muireadhach II, Earl of Menteith, Scottish nobleman
 Muireadhach III, Earl of Menteith, Scottish nobleman
 Murdoch Stewart, Duke of Albany, Scottish nobleman
 Murdoch Macdonald, British politician and civil engineer
 Murdoch MacLennan (born 1949), British media executive

Surname 

 Alexi Murdoch, Scottish-born singer
 Alister Murdoch, Australian air marshal
 Beamish Murdoch, judge and historian of Nova Scotia
 Ben Murdoch-Masila, New Zealand Rugby League player
 Billy Murdoch, Australian cricketer
 Billy Murdoch (Scottish footballer)
 Bobby Murdoch, Scottish footballer
 Blair Murdoch, Canadian television producer
 Bradley John Murdoch, Australian murderer
 Brian H. Murdoch (1930–2020), Irish mathematician
 Colin Murdoch, New Zealand pharmacist and veterinarian who invented disposable hypodermic syringes
 David Murdoch – several people including
 David Murdoch, Scottish sportsman
 Don Murdoch, National Hockey League player
 Elisabeth Murdoch (businesswoman), daughter of Rupert Murdoch
 Elisabeth Murdoch (senior), philanthropist, wife of Keith Murdoch and mother of Rupert Murdoch
 George Murdoch, first mayor of Calgary, Alberta, Canada
 Iris Murdoch, British novelist and philosopher
 James Murdoch – several people including
 James Murdoch (born 1972), British-American businessman
 John E. Murdoch, American historian and philosopher of science
 John Smith Murdoch, Australian architect
 Keith Murdoch, Australian journalist and father of Rupert Murdoch
 Keith Murdoch (rugby union) (1943–2018), New Zealand rugby union footballer
 Lachlan Murdoch, former chief operating officer of News Corporation and eldest son of Rupert Murdoch
 Lachlan Murdoch, Canadian actor
 Marion Murdoch (1849–?), American minister
 Richard Murdoch, British comedian and light actor
 Robert C. Murdoch, New Zealand malacologist
 Rupert Murdoch, Australian-American media mogul, CEO and Chairman of News Corporation
 Stuart Murdoch (football manager), former footballer and ex-manager of Milton Keynes Dons F.C.
 Stuart Murdoch (musician), Scottish singer
 Trevor Murdoch, American professional wrestler
 Walter Murdoch, Australian academic and essayist
 William Murdoch – several people including
 William McMaster Murdoch, first officer on the RMS Titanic
 William Murdoch, Scottish engineer and inventor of gas lighting (sometimes spelled "Murdock")
 William Murdoch (poet), Scottish poet

Fictional characters 

 Detective William Murdoch, protagonist in a series of novels by Maureen Jennings, and a spin-off television series
 John Murdoch, protagonist in the feature film Dark City
 Murdoc Niccals, bassist for the virtual band Gorillaz
 Murdoc, a character in the MacGyver television series
 Murdoch, a tender engine character in Thomas & Friends, Introduced in the Series 7 episode (Peace and Quiet)

Organisations 
 Murdoch University, a public university in Perth, Australia

See also 
 Murdaugh
 Murdock
 Muirchertach
 Murtagh

References 

English-language surnames
Surnames of Lowland Scottish origin
Anglicised Irish-language surnames
Anglicised Scottish Gaelic-language surnames
Irish-language masculine given names
Scottish Gaelic masculine given names